"Are You Ready" is a song by Joanne, released as the third single from her 2001 debut album, Do Not Disturb. It was released on 8 November 2001. It debuted and peaked at No. 41 on the ARIA chart.

Track 3 on the single is featured as an extended version on the album Do Not Disturb on track 10. An alternative version is featured on the debut album on track 14 titled; "Hot Hot Crazy".

Music video
The music video was filmed in November 1999, at Dance World 301 in a ballet studio. Joanne's management team and crew built the set with their own hands. Their aim was to create a mysterious location to set the scene for the video.

Formats and track listings
Australian CD single:
 "Are You Ready" [Radio Edit] (Azlan/Kourilov/Accom/Giannaros) – 3:27
 "Are You Ready" [Extended Radio] (Azlan/Kourilov/Accom/Giannaros) – 5:53
 "Are You Ready" [Pump Funk] (Azlan/Kourilov/Accom/Giannaros) – 4:07

Charts

References

1999 singles
1999 songs
Joanne Accom songs
Songs written by Joanne Accom